Butty may refer to:

 Butty boat, a type of narrowboat
 Julius Butty, Canadian record producer
 The Butties, a cover band
 A sandwich, in Northern English dialect
 A Welsh term for buddy or friend from byti a person who helped in the coal mines

See also 
 Batty
 Chip butty